William Henry Kruskal (October 10, 1919 – April 21, 2005) was an American mathematician and statistician.  He is best known for having formulated the Kruskal–Wallis one-way analysis of variance (together with W. Allen Wallis), a widely used nonparametric statistical method.

Biography
Kruskal was born to a Jewish family in New York City to a successful fur wholesaler.  His mother, Lillian Rose Vorhaus Kruskal Oppenheimer, became a noted promoter of origami during the early era of television.  He was the oldest of five children, three of whom, including himself, became researchers in mathematics and physics; see Joseph Kruskal and Martin Kruskal.  Kruskal left Antioch College to attend Harvard University, receiving bachelor's and master's degrees in mathematics in 1940 and 1941.  He pursued a Ph.D. in mathematical sciences at Columbia University, graduating in 1955. During the Second World War, Kruskal served at the U.S. Naval Proving Ground in Dahlgren, Virginia.  After brief stints working for his father and lecturing at Columbia, he joined the University of Chicago faculty as an instructor in statistics in 1950.

In 1958 he was elected as a Fellow of the American Statistical Association.
He edited the Annals of Mathematical Statistics from 1958 to 1961, served as president of the Institute of Mathematical Statistics in 1971, and of the American Statistical Association in 1982.  Kruskal retired as professor emeritus in 1990. He died in Chicago.

Notable works
 
 
 
 
 
 
 
 

The Springer monograph cited is a reprint of the three Goodman and Kruskal Journal of the American Statistical Association cited above.

There is a complete bibliography .

References

 The University of Chicago News Office, "William Kruskal, Statistician, 1919–2005", press release, April 27, 2005.
 Kruskal was awarded the Samuel S. Wilks Award in 1978

Interview

External links
 Guide to the William Kruskal Papers 1964-1973 at the University of Chicago Special Collections Research Center

1919 births
2005 deaths
20th-century American mathematicians
21st-century American mathematicians
20th-century American Jews
American statisticians
Harvard University alumni
Columbia Graduate School of Arts and Sciences alumni
University of Chicago faculty
Fellows of the American Statistical Association
Presidents of the American Statistical Association
Presidents of the Institute of Mathematical Statistics
21st-century American Jews
Mathematical statisticians